Trundle may refer to:

People
George T. Trundle Jr. (1884–1954), American engineer
Lee Trundle, an English footballer
Robert Trundle, an American philosopher

Places
Trundle, New South Wales, a town in Australia
Trundle (hill fort), a hill fort in West Sussex, England
Trundle Island, Antarctica

Miscellaneous
Trundle bed, a bed that is stored under another bed
Trundle wheel, a measuring device based on the circumference of a wheel
 Trundle, the Troll King, a playable champion character in the multiplayer online battle arena video game League of Legends

See also
Tründle and Spring, a 1991 EP by American punk rock band Pinhead Gunpowder
Trundling
Hoop trundling